Francisco Gamboa Gómez (born 20 July 1985) is a Mexican former professional footballer. He last played as a defender for Atlante, wearing jersey #4. He made his debut September 25, 2005 against UAG, a game which resulted in a 2–1 victory for Toluca.

Honours
Toluca
Primera División de México: Apertura 2005, Apertura 2008, Bicentenario 2010

References

External links
 
 Francisco Gamboa at ESMAS Statistics 
 

1985 births
Living people
Footballers from Guadalajara, Jalisco
Association football defenders
Mexican footballers
Deportivo Toluca F.C. players
Atlante F.C. footballers
Liga MX players